Dentist Love is a silent short animated film by Winkler Pictures, and among the many starring the comic strip character Krazy Kat.

Plot
The cartoon starts with Krazy and a spider monkey playing banjos on opposite sides of a hilltop house. But because they are playing different tunes, they find each other's play disrupting. The two meet each other face to face, resulting in Krazy smashing his banjo on the monkey's head, leaving the simian completely unconscious. Krazy then takes some of the monkey's candy before wandering the outdoors.

As Krazy wanders further, he encounters a hippo having a toothache, and a rat who tries to extract the tooth. After being unable to remove it, the rat gives up and tells Krazy to take over. Krazy tries to pull the tooth but finds it very difficult. He even goes as far as entering the hippo's stomach but to no avail. As a last resort, Krazy places a stick of dynamite in the cavity of the tooth and lights the fuse. Following the blast, Krazy manages to take a pair of teeth, and even receives payment as a money note falls from above. The hippo, however, is nowhere to be seen, suggesting that the animal might have been obliterated by the explosion.

See also
 Krazy Kat filmography

References

External links
 Dentist Love at the Big Cartoon Database

1925 short films
1925 animated films
American black-and-white films
American silent short films
Krazy Kat shorts
1920s American animated films
American animated short films
Animated films about cats